BeatThatQuote.com was a British price comparison site specializing in personal finance products. The site was disabled in 2013 after being acquired by Google.

History
BeatThatQuote.com was launched by John Paleomylites in February 2005 based in London's Kentish Town. In the financial year 2006 to 2007 the company posted revenues of £7.8 million.

BeatThatQuote.com was ranked by Nielsen Online as the fastest growing UK website in 2007, was acquired by Google in March 2011 for £37.7 million. BeatThatQuote.com was penalised by Google for search engine spamming the day after it acquired it.

In turn, Google created Google Compare using some of the technology that they had acquired. However, this was not a success and it was closed in March 2016.

Affiliations 

As well as operating their own website, BeatThatQuote.com also provided the services for other comparison websites such as ArgosCompare.co.uk and other financial comparison websites.

See also 
Confused.com
Gocompare.com
UKPower.co.uk
uSwitch
Money.co.uk
Moneyfacts.co.uk
Moneysupermarket.com

References

External links
 

Comparison shopping websites
Online companies of the United Kingdom
Discontinued Google acquisitions